The Maryland Open is the Maryland state open golf tournament, open to both amateur and professional golfers. It is organized by the Maryland State Golf Association. It has been played annually since 1921 at a variety of courses around the state. It was considered a PGA Tour event briefly in the 1920s.

Winners

2022 Evan Katz
2021 Jake Griffin (a) 
2020 Josh Speight
2019 Davis Lamb (a)
2018 Ryan Cole
2017 Brad Miller
2016 Sean Bosdosh
2015 Denny McCarthy (a)
2014 Patrick McCormick (a)
2013 Denny McCarthy (a)
2012 Sean Bosdosh (a)
2011 David Hutsell
2010 Denny McCarthy (a)
2009 Matt Bassler
2008 Chip Sullivan
2007 Billy Wingerd
2006 Chip Sullivan
2005 Wayne DeFrancesco
2004 Chip Sullivan
2003 Kirk Lombardi (a)
2002 Chip Sullivan
2001 Steve Madson
2000 Dennis Winters
1999 Michael Mitchell
1998 Keith Unikel
1997 Dean Wilson
1996 Steve Madsen
1995 Wayne DeFrancesco
1994 Wayne DeFrancesco
1993 Glen Barrett
1992 Del Ponchock
1991 Jon Stanley
1990 Bob Boyd
1989 Chris Peddicord
1988 Joe Klinchock
1987 Fred Funk
1986 Marty West
1985 Larry Rentz
1984 Gary Marlowe
1983 Fred Funk
1982 Mark Alwin
1981 George Graefe
1980 Larry Ringer
1979 Wheeler Stewart
1978 Gary Marlowe
1977 Marty West
1976 George Graefe
1975 Marty West
1974 Chris Pigott
1973 Henri DeLozier
1972 Larry Ringer
1971 Doug Ballenger
1970 Bill Sporre
1969 Dick Whetzle
1968 Leo Wykle
1967 Leo Wykle
1966 Deane Beman (a)
1965 Charlie Bassler
1964 Paul Haviland
1963 Clarence Doser
1962 Dick Whetzle
1961 Melvin Rowe
1960 Lloyd Kelly
1959 Walter Romans
1958 Charlie Bassler
1957 Charlie Bassler
1956 Walter Romans
1955 Charlie Bassler
1954 John O'Donnell
1953 Charlie Bassler
1952 Jack Isaacs
1951 Jack Isaacs
1950 Charlie Bassler
1949 Jack Isaas
1948 Charlie Bassler
1947 Spencer Overton
1946 Harry Griesmer
1945 Lew Worsham
1944 Cliff Spencer
1943 No tournament
1942 Wiffy Cox
1941 Bobby Brownell
1940 Cliff Spencer
1939 John O'Donnell
1938 Andy Gibson
1937 Cliff Spencer
1936 Al Houghton
1935 Vic Ghezzi
1934 Al Houghton
1933 Al Houghton
1932 Al Houghton
1931 Ralph Beach
1930 Glenn Spencer
1929 Gene Larkin
1928 Bobby Cruickshank
1927 Fred McLeod
1926 Leo Diegel
1925 Charley Betschler
1924 Fred A. Savage, Jr.
1923 Tom Sasscer
1922 B. Warren Corkran
1921 D. Clarke Corkran

(a) denotes amateur

External links
Maryland State Golf Association
List of winners

Former PGA Tour events
Golf in Maryland
State Open golf tournaments
Recurring sporting events established in 1921